Fashion in the years following World War II is characterized by the resurgence of haute couture after the austerity of the war years. Square shoulders and short skirts were replaced by the soft femininity of Christian Dior's "New Look" silhouette, with its sweeping longer skirts, fitted waist, and rounded shoulders, which in turn gave way to an unfitted, structural look in the later 1950s.

General trends

Return of fashion 
By 1947, the Paris fashion houses had reopened, and once again Paris resumed its position as the arbiter of high fashion. The "orderly, rhythmic evolution of fashion change" had been disrupted by the war, and a new direction was long overdue. The padded shoulder, tubular, boxy line, and short skirt (that had been around since before the war and was identified with uniforms) was gone. A succession of style trends led by Christian Dior and Cristóbal Balenciaga defined the changing silhouette of women's clothes through the 1950s. Television joined fashion magazines and movies in disseminating clothing styles. The new silhouette had narrow shoulders, a cinched waist, bust emphasis, and longer skirts, often with wider hems.

Beginnings of Asian fashion 

During the early 1950s, designers in the decolonised Third World sought to create an identity distinct from European fashion. Urban professionals in Asia and the Middle East, for example, might wear Western style suits with indigenous headgear such as the Astrakhan, fez or keffiyeh. In India, the traditional Sherwani was adapted into the Nehru collar business suit, while women frequently wore sarees in the workplace. Meanwhile, the Red Chinese developed the unisex Mao Suit in green, blue and grey to promote socialist values of equality. Due to their minimalist, modern design, both types of suit would later be adopted by mod and British invasion trendsetters during the 1960s and 70s, especially The Beatles and The Monkees.

Casual clothing and teenage style 

One result of the Post-World War II economic expansion was a flood of synthetic fabrics and easy-care processes. "Drip-dry" nylon, orlon and dacron, which could retain heat-set pleats after washing, became immensely popular. Acrylic, polyester, triacetate and spandex were all introduced in the 1950s. During the 1940s nylon stockings were an incredibly popular product as they were a lightweight alternative to silk and wool stockings. For the duration of WW2 the Du Pont company produced nylon exclusively for the war effort. At the end of 1945 the demand for nylon stockings was so great that Nylon riots ensued at stores selling the products.

 
Social changes went hand-in-hand with new economic realities, and one result was that many young people who would have become wage-earners early in their teens before the war now remained at home and dependent upon their parents through high school and beyond, establishing the notion of the teenage years as a separate stage of development. Teens and college co-eds adopted skirts and sweaters as a virtual uniform, and the American fashion industry began to target teenagers as a specialized market segment in the 1940s.

In the United Kingdom, the Teddy boys of the post-war period created the "first truly independent fashions for young people", favouring an exaggerated version of the Edwardian-flavoured British fashion with skinny ties and narrow, tight trousers worn short enough to show off garish socks. In North America, greasers had a similar social position. Previously, teenagers dressed similarly to their parents, but now a rebellious and different youth style was being developed.

Young adults returning to college under the G.I. Bill adopted an unpretentious, functional wardrobe, and continued to wear blue jeans with shirts and pullovers for general informal wear after leaving school. Jack Kerouac introduced the phrase "Beat Generation" in 1948, generalizing from his social circle to characterize the underground, anti-conformist youth gathering in New York at that time. The term "beatnik" was coined by Herb Caen of the San Francisco Chronicle in 1958, and the stereotypical "beat" look of sunglasses, berets, black turtlenecks, and unadorned dark clothing provided another fashion alternative for youths of both sexes, encouraged by the marketing specialists of Madison Avenue.

Womenswear

New Look Revolution 
 
On 12 February 1947 at 10.30 a.m. Christian Dior, aged 42, presented his first collection at 30 Avenue Montaigne, which was strewn with flowers by Lachaume. The Editor-in-Chief of Harper's Bazaar, Carmel Snow, strongly believed in the couturier's talent, which she had already noted in 1937 with the Café Anglais model that he designed for Robert Piguet. At the end of the fashion show, she exclaimed, "It's quite a revolution, dear Christian! Your dresses have such a new look!" A correspondent from Reuters seized upon the slogan and quickly wrote it on a note that he threw from the balcony to a courier posted on Avenue Montaigne. The news reached the United States even before the rest of France, where the press had been on strike for a month.

With his revolutionary New Look, Christian Dior wrote a new chapter in the history of fashion. Furthermore, in order to write it, he literally constructed it with his own hands. The designer had to hammer away at a Stockman mannequin that was too tough and unyielding to bear the preparatory canvases of his visionary wardrobe, says his friend Suzanna Luling: "And so, with big, nervous blows of the hammer, he gave the mannequin the same form of the ideal woman for the fashion that he was to launch." His aim was clear; his hand did not tremble. "I wanted my dresses to be 'constructed', moulded on the curves of the female body whose contours they would stylise. I accentuated the waist, the volume of the hips, emphasised the bust, In order to give my designs more hold, I had nearly all the fabrics lined with percale or taffeta, renewing a tradition that had long been abandoned." Thus, on 12 February 1947 at 10.30 a.m., the announcer introduced "numéro un, number one". The first outfit was worn by Marie-Thérese and opened the show during which the audience saw 90 different creations file past, belonging to two principal lines: En Huit and Corolle. Bettina Ballard, Fashion Editor at Vogue, had returned to New York a few months earlier after 15 years spent covering French fashion from Paris: "We have witnessed a revolution in fashion at the same time as a revolution in the way of showing fashion."
The "softness" of the New Look was deceptive; the curved jacket peplum shaped over a high, rounded, curved shoulders, and full skirt of Dior's clothes relied on an inner construction of new interlining materials to shape the silhouette. This silhouette was drastically changed from its previous more masculine, stiff, triangular shape to a much more feminine form.

Throughout the post-war period, a tailored, feminine look was prized and accessories such as gloves and pearls were popular. Tailored suits had fitted jackets with peplums, usually worn with a long, narrow pencil skirt. Day dresses had fitted bodices and full skirts, with jewel or low-cut necklines or Peter Pan collars. Shirtdresses, with a shirt-like bodice, were popular, as were halter-top sundresses. Skirts were narrow or very full, held out with petticoats; poodle skirts were a brief fad. Evening dresses were  ankle-length (called "ballerina length"). Cocktail dresses, "smarter than a day dress but not as formal as a dinner or evening dress" were worn for early-evening parties. Short shrugs and bolero jackets, often made to match low-cut dresses, were worn. Meanwhile, in Israel, simple Biblical sandals, blue cotton shirts and utilitarian, khaki military-inspired dress remained popular choices for many women due to ongoing economic austerity and the need to feel prepared for war.

Intimate apparel 
Christian Dior's 'New Look' collection in 1947 brought a revolution to the fashionable silhouette of the 1950s. Dior's nostalgic femininity of round shoulders, full skirts, padded hips and tiny waists replaced the boxy style of the wartime period at WWII. The trend of hourglass silhouette brought by the popularity of Dior guaranteed the market for intimate apparel. Although intimate apparels are usually hidden by outerwear, intimate apparel is especially emblematic for the contradictory beauty in the 1950s as the silhouette was created depends on the type of foundation garments worn. Foundation garments became essential items to maintain the curvy silhouette, especially waspies, girdles and horsehair padding. For example, the sales of corsets doubled in the decade 1948-58 (Haye, 1996 p. 187).
Dior's 'New Look' collection brought back the boned intimate apparels for women, even the young one, in order to create the feminised silhouettes that embrace feminity. Symington Corset Company of Market Harborough was one of the famous intimate apparel producers in the 1950s as they are the official producer of Dior's corselettes and girdles. "All the girdles were produced to the same design, in either black or white. The sugar-pink cotton velvet trimming was a particular feature of the range, and some were woven with Christian Dior's initials in the elastic panels on the side..." (Lynn, 2010, p. 106). A brand new 'Bri-Nylon' fabric was introduced by the British Nylon Spinners. This fabric was popular fabric to be applied on intimate apparel in the 1950s because it was one of the first easy-to-launder and drip-dry fabric. There was a full corset advertisement in 1959 shows the popularity of 'Bri-Nylon' and the design of the corselet in the 1950s. 'This exquisite Dior corselet features jacquard elastic net with the down-stretch back panel of stain elastic. The enchanting front panel is in Bri-Nylon lace and marquisette highlighted with criss-cross bands of narrow velvet ribbon. It has side fastening - partly hook and eye with zipping extension. The very light boning is covered with velveteen.' (Warren, 2001, p. 30 ) From the above advertisement, it is not hard to find that the corselets in the 1950s were constructed in details with boning, panels, different fabrics in different elasticity.

While the corselets reshaping the women's body with tiny waists and big hips, a new shape of bra called 'cathedral bra' was introduced and became popular in the 1950s. It is called 'cathedral bra' because there would be pointed arches created by the bones over the breasts when the bra is worn. The bones also separate and define the shape of the breasts by pressing them into a pointed or bullet shape. Therefore, 'cathedral bra' was also called the bullet bra. This brassiere design was popularised by actresses like Patti Page, Marilyn Monroe, and Lana Turner, who was nicknamed the "Sweater Girl." Although this brassiere design was designed for wearing strapless cocktail dresses and evening gowns and became popular during the 1950s, the market for this design was short-lived because it was 'likely to slip down or need adjustment throughout the evening' (Lynn, 2010, p. 152). However, another brassiere design re-entered the market and grew popularity during the 1950s which even influenced the modern intimate design. Underwire bras were first introduced to the market in the 1930s, however, it was forced to quit the market because the steel supply was restricted in the 1940s for WWII. Underwire brassiere design re-entered the market as it helped to uplift the shapes of the breasts to form the trendy curvy silhouette with big busts in the 1950s. Made with nylon, elastic nylon net and steel underwires, the underwire bras helped to create fashionable high, pert bosoms. Underwire bras are still dominating items in the modern intimate apparel industry.

Clothes for the space age 
From the mid-1950s, a new unfitted style of clothing appeared as an alternative to the tight waist and full skirt associated with the New Look. Vogue Magazine called the knitted chemise the "T-shirt dress." Paris designers began to transform this popular fashion into haute couture. Spanish designer Balenciaga had shown unfitted suits in Paris as early as 1951 and unfitted dresses from 1954. In 1958, Yves Saint Laurent, Dior's protégé and successor, debuted the "Trapeze Line," adding novel dimension to the chemise dress. These dresses featured a shaped bodice with sloping shoulders and a high waist, but the signature shape resulted from a flaring bodice, creating a waistless line from bodice to knees. These styles only slowly gained acceptance by the wider public. Coco Chanel made a comeback in 1954 and an important look of the latter 1950s was the Chanel suit, with a braid-trimmed cardigan-style jacket and A-line skirt. By 1957, most suits featured lightly fitted jackets reaching just below the waist and shorter, narrower skirts. Balenciaga's clothes featured few seams and plain necklines, and following his lead chemise dresses without waist seams, either straight and unfitted or in a princess style with a slight A-line, became popular. The sleeveless, princess-line dress was called a skimmer. A more fitted version was called a sheath dress.

Sportswear 
New York had become an American design center during the war, and remained so, especially for sportswear, in the post-war period. Women who had worn trousers on war service refused to abandon these practical garments which suited the informal aspects of the post-war lifestyle. By 1955, tight fitting drainpipe jeans became popular among American women. Casual sportswear was also an increasingly large component of women's wardrobes, especially the white T-shirts popularized by Brigitte Bardot and Sandra Milo between 1957 and 1963. Casual skirts were narrow or very full. In the 1950s, pants became very narrow, and were worn ankle-length. Pants cropped to mid-calf were houseboy pants; shorter pants, to below the knee, were called pedal-pushers. Shorts were very short in the early 1950s, and mid-thigh length Bermuda shorts appeared around 1954 and remained fashionable through the remainder of the decade. Loose printed or knit tops were fashionable with pants or shorts. They also wore bikinis to sport training.

Swimsuits, including the Gottex brand popular in Israel and America, were one- or two-piece; some had loose bottoms like shorts with short skirts. High waisted Bikinis appeared in Europe and the South Pacific islands, but were not commonly worn in mainland America until the late 1950s.

Hats and hairstyles 

Hair was worn short and curled with the New Look, and hats were essential for all but the most casual occasions. Wide-brimmed "saucer hats" were shown with the earliest New Look suits, but smaller hats soon predominated. Very short cropped hairstyles were fashionable in the early 1950s. By mid-decade hats were worn less frequently, especially as fuller hairstyles like the short, curly poodle cut and later bouffant and beehive became fashionable. "Beat" girls wore their hair long and straight, and teenagers adopted the ponytail, short or long.

Maternity wear 
In the 1950s, Lucille Ball was the first woman to show her pregnancy on TV.
 The television show I Love Lucy brought new attention to maternity wear. Most of the maternity dresses were two pieces with loose tops and narrow skirts. Stretch panels accommodated for the woman's growing figure. The baby boom of the 1940s to the 1950s also caused focus on maternity wear. Even international designers such as Givenchy and Norman Hartnell created maternity wear clothing lines. Despite the new emphasis on maternity wear in the 1950s maternity wear fashions were still being photographed on non-pregnant women for advertisements.

On September 29, 1959, the maternity panty  was patented which provided expansion in the vertical direction of the abdomen. The front panel of this maternity undergarment was composed of a high degree of elasticity so in extreme stretched conditions, the woman could still feel comfortable.

Style gallery 1945–1950 

Dutch dress patterns, foreshadowing the New Look fashions, 1946
Promotional picture of Michele Morgan for The Chase, 1946
Promotional poster of Rita Hayworth as Gilda, 1946
Models wearing evening dresses designed by Dorothy O'Hara, Orry-Kelly, Al Teitelbaum and Howard Greer, 1947
Berlin street fashion, 1948
Actress Probable unidentified young actress in Cannes, 1948 
Tea length patchwork skirt by Tina Leser, 1948
Argentine women in Mar del Plata, 1948
Teacher in Raleigh, USA in 1949
Argentine First Lady Eva Perón wearing a custom Christian Dior evening dress, 1949.
Dutch model wearing the New Look style, 1949

Style gallery 1950–1954 

Argentine fashion photograph by Boleslaw Senderowicz, .
Wide-legged trousers with cuffs (turn-ups) are shown with a short-sleeved, fitted sweater, Germany, 1952.
Two-piece swimsuit, 1952.
Fashion in vacation in Hungary 1952.
Actress Audrey Hepburn, 1953.
Actress Lucille Ball in cropped houseboy pants at a press conference, Los Angeles, 1953.
Fashion illustration of a "corselette", showing the pointed bust and curvy hipline of 1953.
Actresses Marilyn Monroe and Jane Russell wear halter-top summer dresses, Hollywood, 1953.
Actress Martha Hyer's hair is worn in a short and curly poodle cut in this publicity photo for Sabrina, 1954.

Style gallery 1954–1960 

First Lady Mamie Eisenhower in bright blue day dress, 1954.
Actress Diahann Carroll wears a full-skirted dress with a small Peter Pan collar, 1955.
Fashion in summer in Florida 1955.
Singer Patti Page wearing a "bullet bra" brassiere design in 1955.
Actress Marilyn Monroe in The Prince and the Showgirl wears a fitted sheath dress with a sweetheart neckline, 1957.
Short hair style, 1958
Summer dresses of 1958 are sleeveless with high, wide "boat" necklines, Dresden.
Suit and pillbox hat in an Argentine fashion spread from 1958.
Princess Alexandra in a Princess Ballgown styled evening dress, 1959.
Newspaper photo of "Miss Beatnik" contestants in Venice, California, 1959.
Women wearing swimsuits in vacation in Hungary 1960.
Summer dress in Hungary 1960.

Menswear

Suits 
Immediately after the war, men's suits were broad-shouldered and often double-breasted. As wartime restrictions on fabric eased, trousers became fuller, and were usually styled with cuffs (turn-ups). In America, Esquire introduced the "Bold Look", with wide shoulders, broad lapels, and an emphasis on bold, coordinated accessories. In Britain, clothing rationing remained in place until 1949. Demobilised soldiers were provided with a suit by the government, usually in blue or grey chalkstripes. Savile Row, the traditional home of bespoke or custom tailoring, had been heavily damaged in the Blitz and was slow to recover. In 1950, Harper's Bazaar proclaimed the "Return of the Beau". Savile Row introduced the "New Edwardian Look", featuring a slightly flared jacket, natural shoulders, and an overall narrower cut, worn with a curly-brimmed bowler hat and a long slender overcoat with velvet collar and cuffs. This was the style commandeered by the Teddy Boys, who added bright socks and a bootlace necktie, achieving a "dizzy combination of Edwardian dandy and American gangster." The horrified tailors of Savile Row dropped the overtly Edwardian touches, but 
the style of business suits continued to move away from the broad English drape cut, and single-breasted two-piece suits with narrower lines and less padding in the shoulders became fashionable everywhere. Dark charcoal gray was the usual color, and the era of the gray flannel suit was born. By the later 1950s, a new Continental style of suit appeared from the fashion houses of Italy, with sharper shoulders, lighter fabrics, shorter, fitted jackets and narrower lapels.

Sports and leisurewear 
Sport coats generally followed the lines of suit coats. Tartan plaids were fashionable in the early 1950s, and later plaids and checks of all types were worn, as were corduroy jackets with leather buttons and car coats. 49er jackets, originally worn by hunters, miners and lumberjacks, were a popular cold weather coat in America and Canada, and would later be adopted by the teenage surfer subculture. On the West Coast many men, including Howard Hughes and Ricky from I Love Lucy, favoured two color gabardine Hollywood jackets with belts and Old West inspired detailing, often in black, white, cream, beige, burgundy, air force blue, mint green, sky blue, chocolate brown, dusky pink, or grey tweed cloth. Khaki-colored pants, called chinos, were worn for casual occasions. Bermuda shorts, often in madras plaid, appeared in mid-decade and were worn with knee socks. Hawaiian shirts, worn untucked from suspenders, also became widely popular during this era. This summer fashion of the Hawaiian or Carioca shirt became particularly popular in America, with even President Truman being photographed wearing a marine flora shirt. Knit shirts and sweaters of various kinds were popular throughout the period. Some young men wore tight trousers or jeans, leather jackets, and white tee shirts.

Hats and hairstyles 
Men's hair fashion favoured the wet look, achieved by the use of products such as Brylcreem. Young men often grew their hair out and, with pomade or other hair treatments, coiffed their hair into pompadours.

Accessories 
Browline glasses were commonly worn by men during the 1950s and early 1960s.

Style gallery 1945–1949

Style gallery 1950–1960

Youth fashion

Hepcats 

During and after the war, oversized zoot suits were worn by rebellious teenagers, hep cats, and gang members, especially African-Americans, Italian-Americans, Cholos a.k.a. pachucos, and Chicanos. Suit coats were long and double breasted, and pants were high waisted and very baggy. The look was completed with a large pocketwatch chain, black and white spectator shoes, a wide brimmed fedora, and a brightly colored silk kipper tie.

Greasers 

From the late 1940s until the mid-1960s, many Irish-American and Italian-American teenagers were involved with hot rodding, custom cars, and chopper bikes. American greasers, Japanese Bosozoku, Swedish Raggare and Aussie Bodgies based their look on the clothing worn by mechanics and fighter pilots, including a black Schott Perfecto leather jacket, blue jean jacket or canvas work jacket, black or white T shirt, button up short sleeve shirts with the sleeves rolled up several times sometimes having a flannel or other types of patterns, and blue Levi's 501 usually worn with either a large or small cuff at the hem, along with Engineer boots, Converse All Stars, penny loafers or other types of dress shoes, and cowboy boots. The British equivalent, known as the Ton-up Boys, dressed similarly but rode lightweight cafe racer Triumph and BSA bikes. Some girls wore jeans and leather jackets like the men, but most wore more typical college attire such as poodle skirts, petticoats, cardigan sweaters, and saddle shoes with bobby socks.

Teds 
During the early 1950s, Britain's own rockabilly subculture appropriated the then fashionable Edwardian revivalist fashion due to its resemblance to the clothing worn by Old West gamblers and the zoot suits seen in gangster films. A typical Teddy Boy outfit included a red or sky blue drape jacket with velvet shawl collar, drainpipe trousers, brocade waistcoat, bolo tie, and winklepickers or brothel creepers. Teddy Girls, known as Judies, often wore long circle skirts, capri pants, espadrilles, cameo brooches and coolie hats.

Ivy League 
The early to mid 1950s also witnessed the beginnings of the Ivy League look among young, wealthy high school and college students in the Eastern United States. Due to the GI Bill, more men were able to go to college and aspired to imitate both the wardrobe and the athletic pursuits of the long-established upper class students. Typical hairstyles included the crew cut, Harvard clip, and regular haircut, and common accessories included cardigan sweaters, sweater vests, Nantucket reds, khaki chino pants, white Oxford shirts, Tootal or Brooks Brothers ties, Ascot neckties, tartan, grey tweed cloth or flannel sportcoats, and seersucker blazers in the South. Known as Squares, Socs, and Jocks, this subculture underwent a revival in the 1980s as the preppy look.

Beatniks 

In the early to mid 1950s, the precursor to the 1960s hippies emerged in New York. Black roll neck sweaters, sandals, sunglasses, striped shirts, horn rimmed glasses, and berets were popular among Beatniks of both sexes, and men often wore beards. The Russian equivalent of the Beatnik, known as Stilyagi (style hunters), wore thick soled shoes, brightly colored socks, and exaggerated American style clothing in imitation of Western film actors and modern jazz musicians.

Children's wear

Due to the baby boom, there was a high demand for clothing for children. Children's clothing began to be made to a higher quality, and some even adopted trends popular with teenagers; many boys started wearing jeans to Elementary school. Many girls' and young women's dresses were styled after those of the older women.
Originally everyday workwear in the Southwestern US, Western clothing comprising jeans, Stetson and checked shirt was worn by many young boys during the 1950s in imitation of singing cowboys like Gene Autry and Roy Rogers. A craze for coonskin caps and fringed shirts coincided with the release of Davy Crockett by Disney during the mid-1950s.

Hairstyles and cosmetics
See Hairstyles in the 1950s.

See also
 Ducktail
 Hubert de Givenchy
 Jean Dessès
 Guy Laroche
 Roger Vivier
 Charles James (designer)
 Hardy Amies
 Grace Kelly
 Babe Paley

Notes

References
 Brockman, Helen. The Theory of Fashion Design, New York: John Wiley and Sons, 1965,
 Cumming, Valerie, C. W. Cunnington and P. E. Cunnington. The Dictionary of Fashion History, Berg, 2010, 
 Samek, Susan M. "Uniformly Feminine: the "Working Chic" of Mainbocher." Dress 20 (1993): p. 33–41.
 Tortora, Phyllis G. and Keith Eubank. Survey of Historic Costume. 2nd Edition, 1994. Fairchild Publications. 
 Tortora, Phyllis G. and Keith Eubank. Survey of Historic Costume. 4th Edition, 2005. Fairchild Publications.

 Walker, Richard: The Savile Row Story, Prion, 1988,

External links
Patent to the Maternity Panty
 
Dresses by Christian Dior, Indianapolis Museum of Art
Children's clothing from the 1950s
Examples of French fashion illustration
 
 
 Vintage Photos - art, life and fashion in the 20th Century.
Madame Grès, an exhibition catalog from The Metropolitan Museum of Art (fully available online as PDF), which contains a good deal of material on fashion from this period

1940s fashion
1950s fashion